Onion is the common name given to plants in the genus Allium. 

Onion or Onions may also refer to:

Places
 Onion Creek (Texas)
 Onion River (disambiguation), various rivers in the United States

People
 Ken Onion (born 1963), American knifemaker
 Todd Bodine (b. 1964), NASCAR driver nicknamed "The Onion"
 Onions (surname)

Arts, entertainment, and media
The Onion, an American digital media company and news satire organization
 Onion, the name of the Pikmin spaceship in Pikmin (series)
 Onion, the name of a character in the animated TV series Steven Universe
 Onion (album), an album by Shannon and the Clams
 Onion, a 2009 album by Mike McClure

Computing and technology
 .onion, a pseudo-top-level domain host suffix
 Onion routing, an anonymous communication technique
 A Toronto-based startup company called Onion manufactures Omega2, a personal single-board computer

Other uses
 Onion (horse), an American thoroughbred racehorse
 False sea onion
 "The Onion", a nickname for the main building of the Sepulveda Unitarian Universalist Society.
 Onion diagram,  a kind of chart that shows the dependencies among parts of an organization or process